The Raduga Kh-15 or RKV-15 (NATO: AS-16 "Kickback"; GRAU:) is a Russian hypersonic aero-ballistic air-to-ground missile carried by the Tupolev Tu-22M and other bombers. Originally developed as a standoff nuclear air-to-ground missile similar to the U.S. Air Force's AGM-69 SRAM, versions with conventional warheads have been developed.

As of early 2019, it was uncertain whether the Kh-15 was in service, with rumors that it had been retired or placed in storage.

Development
In 1967, MKB Raduga started developing the Kh-2000 as a replacement for the Kh-22 (NATO reporting name AS-4 Kitchen) heavy anti-shipping missile. Development of the Kh-15 started some time in the early 1970s. The sophistication of the design made it suitable for other roles, and a nuclear-tipped version was developed in tandem with the conventionally armed variant. An upgrade under development was cancelled in 1991, but reports in 1998 suggested an upgraded Kh-15 might be fitted to Su-35 (Flanker-E) tactical aircraft.

Design

Operational history
It entered service in 1980. It can be carried by the Su-33, Su-34, Tu-95MS-6 'Bear-H', Tu-22M3 'Backfire C', and Tu-160 'Blackjack'.

Variants
 Kh-15 (RKV-15) - the original version with nuclear warhead and inertial guidance
 Kh-15P - passive seeker for anti-radar use
 Kh-15S - active radar seeker for anti-shipping use

Operators

Current

Former
- Passed onto successor states

Similar weapons
 KSR-5 (AS-6 'Kingfish') - heavy anti-surface missile carried under the wings of Tu-22M
 Kh-59 (AS-13 'Kingbolt') - ASM for tactical aircraft, up to 285 km range
 Kh-37 (updated version of AS-20 'Kayak') - land attack version of subsonic Kh-35 Anti-Ship missile, 250 km range
 AGM-69 SRAM - 1000 kg US missile with up to 170 km range

Photo Gallery

Notes

References
 

Kh-015
Kh-015
Cold War air-to-surface missiles of the Soviet Union
Cold War anti-ship missiles of the Soviet Union
Air-launched ballistic missiles
Kh-015
Kh-015
Kh-015
MKB Raduga products
Nuclear air-to-surface missiles
Military equipment introduced in the 1980s